Avreya is an old and uncommon Russian female first name. It derives from the Latin word aurea, meaning golden.

The diminutives of "Avreya" are Ava and Reya.

References

Notes

Sources
Н. А. Петровский (N. A. Petrovsky). "Словарь русских личных имён" (Dictionary of Russian First Names). ООО Издательство "АСТ". Москва, 2005. 

